Peter Elson (13 January 1947 – March 1998) was an English science fiction illustrator whose work appeared on the covers of numerous science fiction paperback novels, as well as in the Terran Trade Authority series of illustrated books.

Biography
Elson, whose illustrations often placed detailed, brightly liveried spacecraft against vividly coloured backgrounds, influenced an entire generation of science fiction illustrators and concept artists.

The look of the PC game Homeworld was heavily influenced by Elson's illustrations of the '70s and '80s, according to artists who worked on the title (he is listed in the Special Thanks section of the game's manual and has a character, Captain Elson, named after him).  Elson was originally slated to create the game's box art, but at the last moment was pre-empted by the publisher's decision to use a 3D rendered scene.

Born in Ealing, west London, he died of a heart attack in Skegness while working on mural paintings for Butlins.
Most of his original work is now owned by his sister.

External links 
Peter Elson website, over 300 images of his work
Some samples of his work
The tribute site of an all-out fan

1947 births
1998 deaths
British speculative fiction artists
English illustrators
Science fiction artists